The  Alaska lunar sample displays are two commemorative plaques consisting of small fragments of Moon specimen brought back with the Apollo 11 and Apollo 17 lunar missions and given in the 1970s to the people of the state of Alaska by United States President Richard Nixon as goodwill gifts.

Description

Apollo 11

Apollo 17

History 

 
The Alaska Apollo 11 lunar commemorative wooden plaque display was on public viewing at the Alaska Transportation Museum in Anchorage in 1973. In September of that year, the museum burned down under suspicious circumstances and the Apollo 11 Alaska lunar plaque display was reported missing. It is suspected that an arsonist started the museum fire on September 6, 1973.

Arthur C. Anderson, an individual Plaintiff v. The State of Alaska an Alaskan State Museums, and agency of the State, Defendants also known as Anderson v. Alaskan State Museums is an Alaska State civil case filed on December 20, 2010 by attorney  Daniel P. Harris in the Superior Court of Alaska Third Judicial District at Anchorage. The subject in this case is the Apollo 11 Moon Rock and plaque that was presented in 1969 by Richard M. Nixon, President of the United States, to Keith Harvey Miller, Governor of Alaska.

After a 2010 story written by Elizabeth Riker for the Capital City Weekly Arthur Coleman Anderson learned that a Moon rock he says he found as a 17-year-old after a fire at the Transportation Museum in Anchorage filed a lawsuit against Alaska and the Alaskan State Museums to determine title of the object.

The missing Moon rocks were returned as of December 7, 2012, and both the Apollo 11 and Apollo 17 displays are at the Alaska State Museum in Juneau.

See also
 List of Apollo lunar sample displays

References

Further reading 
 

Stolen and missing moon rocks
Tourist attractions in Alaska